Francesco Antonelli may refer to:
 Franco Antonelli (born 1934), Italian long-distance runner
 Francesco Antonelli (footballer) (born 1999), Italian footballer